Bale may refer to:

Akar-Bale language of the Andaman Islands, India
Balesi language of Ethiopia